Magdalena Lambova Tasheva (Bulgarian: Магдалена Ламбова Ташева; born 1 March 1953) in Gorna Oryahovitsa, is a Bulgarian journalist and politician who is a member of the Attack. Tasheva is the presenter and host of the "В окото на бурята" ("In the eye of the storm") segment on Alpha TV.

Tasheva graduated from Sofia University with a degree in nuclear physics.

She speaks English, French and Russian in addition to her native Bulgarian.

References

1953 births
Living people
People from Gorna Oryahovitsa
Bulgarian journalists
Bulgarian women journalists
Bulgarian nationalists
Attack (political party) politicians
Members of the National Assembly (Bulgaria)
Sofia University alumni